The Chinese Elm cultivar Ulmus parvifolia 'Pathfinder' is another development by A. M. Townsend of the USDA National Arboretum registered in 1990.

Description
The tree is of modest proportions, rarely reaching > 11 m in height, with a crown slightly less in diameter. The leaves are a glossy yellow-green, and variously described as turning 'grayish red' or 'brilliant red' in autumn. The trunk sports the typical mottled bark.

Pests and diseases
The species and its cultivars are highly resistant, but not immune, to Dutch elm disease, and unaffected by the Elm Leaf Beetle Xanthogaleruca luteola. However, tolerance of Elm Yellows in the USA was found to be poor.

Cultivation
'Pathfinder' is not known to be in cultivation beyond North America.

Accessions

North America

Arnold Arboretum, US. Acc. no. 135-98

References

External links
http://www.ces.ncsu.edu/depts/hort/consumer/factsheets/trees-new/cultivars/ulmus_parvifolia.htm Ulmus parvifolia cultivar list.

Chinese elm cultivar
Ulmus articles missing images
Ulmus